Eliécer Alfonso Canelo Sánchez (born 30 July 1998) is a Venezuelan volleyball player. He competed in the 2020 Summer Olympics.

References

1998 births
Living people
Sportspeople from Maracay
Volleyball players at the 2020 Summer Olympics
Venezuelan men's volleyball players
Olympic volleyball players of Venezuela
21st-century Venezuelan people